Aldo Andreotti (born 18 July 1947) is an Italian sports shooter. He competed in the men's 25 metre rapid fire pistol event at the 1984 Summer Olympics.

References

External links
 

1947 births
Living people
Italian male sport shooters
Olympic shooters of Italy
Shooters at the 1984 Summer Olympics
Sportspeople from the Province of Lucca